"Tell Me Why" is a song produced by Swedish DJs Steve Angello and Axwell (both later members of the trio Swedish House Mafia) under the name "Supermode" (originally called "Supermongo"). The song interpolates two Bronski Beat songs from their album The Age of Consent. The music is sampled from the song "Smalltown Boy", and the lyrics are taken from the song "Why?". The vocals are reconstructed and performed by Hal Ritson.

Track listings

Swedish maxi-CD single
 "Tell Me Why" (radio edit)
 "Tell Me Why" (vocal club mix)
 "Tell Me Why" (TV Rock)
 "Tell Me Why" (Raul Rincon mix)
 "Tell Me Why" (original)

UK CD single
 "Tell Me Why" (radio edit)
 "Tell Me Why" (vocal club mix)
 "Tell Me Why" (original mix)
 "Tell Me Why" (2 Elements remix)
 "Tell Me Why" (Raul Rincon mix)
 "Tell Me Why" (TV Rock remix)
 "Tell Me Why" (video CD-ROM)

UK 12-inch single
A1. "Tell Me Why" (vocal club mix)
B1. "Tell Me Why" (original mix)
B2. "Tell Me Why" (Raul Rincon remix)

Australian CD single
 "Tell Me Why" (radio edit)
 "Tell Me Why" (original mix)
 "Tell Me Why" (Raul Rincon remix)
 "Tell Me Why" (TV Rock remix)

Charts

Weekly charts

Year-end charts

Certifications

Release history

References

2006 songs
2006 singles
Songs written by Jimmy Somerville
Steve Angello songs
Axwell songs
Data Records singles